Joaquim Augusto Gomes Oliveira (born November 21, 1965, in Lisbon) is a former road bicycle racer from Portugal. He is considered one of the best Portuguese cyclists of all time, being best known for his mountain climbing capabilities.

During his career he won two editions of Volta a Portugal (1989 and 1993), participating in 18 editions of the competition. Currently he is the director of Volta a Portugal.

Major results

1987
 1st  Overall Grande Prémio Abimota
1st Stage 3
 1st Stage 7 Grande Prémio Jornal de Notícias
1988
 1st  Overall Volta ao Algarve
 1st  Overall Volta ao Alentejo
1st Stage 6b (ITT)
 1st Stage 5a Troféu Joaquim Agostinho
 1st Stage 6 Grande Prémio Jornal de Notícias
 3rd Overall Volta a Portugal
1st Stage 3 (TTT)
1989
 1st  Overall Volta a Portugal
1st Stages 10b, 15 & 19
 6th Overall Troféu Joaquim Agostinho
1990
 1st  Overall Troféu Joaquim Agostinho
 2nd Overall Volta a Portugal
1st Stages 9 & 13
1991
 2nd Overall Troféu Joaquim Agostinho
1st Stage 5
 2nd Overall Volta ao Algarve
1st Stage 4
 3rd Road race, National Road Championships
1992
 1st  Overall Volta ao Algarve
1st Stage 3a
 1st Stage 4 Tour du Vaucluse
 1st Stage 1 Troféu Joaquim Agostinho
 3rd Overall Volta a Portugal
1st Stage 8
1993
 1st  Overall Volta a Portugal
1st Stages 8 & 9
 1st Stage 8 Vuelta del Uruguay
 10th Overall Critérium du Dauphiné Libéré
1994
 1st  Overall Troféu Joaquim Agostinho
1st Stage 5
 3rd Overall Volta a Portugal
1st Stages 10 & 14
 3rd Overall Volta ao Alentejo
1995
 1st  Overall Grande Prémio Jornal de Notícias
1st Stage 3
 1st Prologue (ITT) Volta a Portugal
1996
 2nd Overall Grande Prémio Jornal de Notícias
 4th Overall Volta a Portugal
1997
 2nd Overall Troféu Joaquim Agostinho
1st Stage 4a (ITT)
 3rd Overall Volta a Portugal
 5th Overall Volta ao Algarve
1998
 5th Overall Volta a Portugal
 10th Overall Volta ao Alentejo
1999
 4th Overall Volta ao Algarve
 9th Overall Vuelta Asturias
2000
 7th Overall Volta a Portugal
 8th Overall G.P. Portugal Telecom
2001
 5th Overall Volta a Portugal
 10th Overall Troféu Joaquim Agostinho

External links
 
 

1965 births
Living people
Portuguese male cyclists
Sportspeople from Lisbon
Volta a Portugal winners